The 2017 Asian Airgun Championships were held at Wako City Gymnasium, Wako, Japan between 6 and 12 December 2017.

Medal summary

Men

Women

Mixed

Medal table

References 
General
 ISSF Results Overview

Specific

External links 
 Official Results

Asian Shooting Championships
Asian
Shooting
2017 in Japanese sport